Ufuk Özbek (born 1 September 1992) is a Turkish professional footballer who plays as an attacking midfielder for Değirmenderespor. He is the brother of Barış Özbek who is also a midfielder.

Career
Özbek spent several years with Schalke 04's youth team, before joining 1. FC Saarbrücken in 2010. He made his debut in the club's first ever match in the 3. Liga, when he replaced Nico Weißmann in a 2–0 defeat against Kickers Offenbach. In July 2013 he moved to Borussia Dortmund II.

References

External links
 
 
 
 
 

Living people
1992 births
People from Castrop-Rauxel
German people of Turkish descent
Sportspeople from Münster (region)
Turkish footballers
Association football midfielders
3. Liga players
Regionalliga players
1. FC Saarbrücken players
Borussia Dortmund II players
Rot Weiss Ahlen players
Turkey youth international footballers